Jean Batmale (18 September 1895 – 3 June 1973) was a French footballer who played as a midfielder for the France national team at the 1920 and 1924 Summer Olympics.

References

External links
 

1895 births
1973 deaths
Sportspeople from Pau, Pyrénées-Atlantiques
French footballers
Association football midfielders
France international footballers
Olympic footballers of France
Footballers at the 1920 Summer Olympics
Footballers at the 1924 Summer Olympics
Stade Rennais F.C. players
Olympique Alès players
OGC Nice players
French football managers
Stade Rennais F.C. managers
AS Monaco FC managers
Club Français players
CO Roubaix-Tourcoing managers
French expatriate footballers
French expatriate sportspeople in Monaco
Expatriate footballers in Monaco
US Nœux-les-Mines managers
Footballers from Nouvelle-Aquitaine